The discography of American rapper J-Kwon consists of four studio albums, one remix album, one mixtape, three music videos  and nine singles, including one as a featured artist.

Albums

Studio albums

Remix albums

Mixtapes

Singles

As lead artist

As featured performer

Guest appearances

Music videos

References 

Hip hop discographies
Discographies of American artists